The 1992 NBA All-Star Game was the 42nd edition of the All-Star Game. It was hosted at the Orlando Arena in Orlando, Florida on February 9, 1992, where the West defeated the East, 153–113. The game is memorable for the return of Los Angeles Lakers guard Magic Johnson, who retired before the 1991–92 NBA season after contracting HIV. Johnson was given the MVP award. He also took the final shot of the game, a three-pointer, and the final 14½ seconds of the game were not played. The game was broadcast by NBC for the second consecutive year.

Overview 

The All-Star Game features NBA players voted in by fans and coaches by conference and position. The teams are divided into the Western Conference and Eastern Conference. All 11 professional basketball players of the "Dream Team," the 1992 United States Olympic men's basketball team, were also on the 1992 All-Star Game roster.

Game description 

Los Angeles Lakers guard Magic Johnson had announced his retirement at the beginning of the 1991–92 season due to testing positive for HIV. Nevertheless, he was voted in by the fans as a guard for the Western Conference team in the All-Star Game. He led all players with 25 points and was awarded the MVP. He also took the final shot of the game, a three-pointer, after which point the game ended with 14.5 seconds left, as players ran onto the court to congratulate Johnson and exchange high-fives. Of his performance, Gary Washburn of the Boston Globe wrote, "It was supposed to be a swan song, one of professional sport's most emotional and riveting moments: the farewell of Magic Johnson from the NBA and perhaps mainstream society after announcing that he had contracted HIV."

The game ended with the West defeating the East 153–113, setting a new record for largest margin of victory (40 points) in the NBA All-Star Game.

Rosters

Both Larry Bird and Dominique Wilkins were selected but did not play due to injury. Kevin Willis replaced Wilkins. Michael Adams replaced Bird.
Scottie Pippen started in place of the injured Bird.
 The rosters included the 11 professional players who would be part of the Dream Team, which won gold medals at the 1992 Summer Olympics in Barcelona.

Boxscore

Western All-Stars

Eastern All-Stars

Game data
Attendance: 14,272
Officials: Darell Garretson, Joe Crawford, Tommy Nuñez
Broadcast Network: NBC
Announce Team: Dick Enberg and Mike Fratello

References

National Basketball Association All-Star Game
All-Star Game
NBA All-Star Game
1990s in Orlando, Florida
February 1992 sports events in the United States
Basketball competitions in Orlando, Florida
Magic Johnson
GMA Network television specials
Michael Jordan